Stephanoconus is a subgenus of sea snails, marine gastropod mollusks in the genus Conus, family Conidae, the cone snails and their allies.

In the latest classification of the family Conidae by Puillandre N., Duda T.F., Meyer C., Olivera B.M. & Bouchet P. (2015), Stephanoconus has become a subgenus of Conus as Conus (Stephanoconus)Mörch, 1852  (type species: Conus leucostictus Gmelin, 1791) represented as Conus Linnaeus, 1758

Species
 Stephanoconus bartschi (Hanna & Strong, 1949) represented as Conus bartschi G. D. Hanna & Strong, 1949 (alternate representation)
 Stephanoconus brunneus (W. Wood, 1828) represented as Conus brunneus Wood, 1828 (alternate representation)
 Stephanoconus regius (Gmelin, 1791) represented as Conus regius Gmelin, 1791 (alternate representation)

References

External links
 To World Register of Marine Species

Conidae
Gastropod subgenera